Rafael Robinson (born June 19, 1969 in Marshall, Texas) is a former American football defensive back in the National Football League. He was signed by the Seattle Seahawks as an undrafted free agent in 1992. He played college football at Wisconsin.

Robinson also played for the Houston / Tennessee Oilers.

1969 births
Living people
American football cornerbacks
American football safeties
Wisconsin Badgers football players
Seattle Seahawks players
Houston Oilers players
Tennessee Oilers players